Beltrán Pagola Goya (28 February 1878 in San Sebastián – 8 July 1950) was a Basque composer, pianist and teacher. He was professor at the Conservatory of Music of San Sebastián. He was influential as teacher of the composers Pablo Sorozábal, Tomás Garbizu, José María Usandizaga and Francisco Escudero.

References

Basque classical composers
Spanish classical pianists
Piano pedagogues
1878 births
1950 deaths